Marijuana Enforcement Tracking Reporting Compliance (METRC) is a system for tracking state-legalized cannabis in California and Colorado in United States. 

In 2017, a $59 million two-year contract was awarded by the State of California to Florida-based Franwell to create the system and supply RFID tags. The system was first developed for Colorado in 2011. As of mid-2017, Franwell's system was in use in California, Colorado, Oregon, Maryland, Alaska, and Michigan. In June, 2017, Franwell withdrew from the Washington State Liquor and Cannabis Board state tracking contract due to the state's preference for vendor(s) who had multiple means of tracking other than proprietary RFID technology, and entry of "non-compliant" data such as production outside of stipulated limits.

References

Further reading

External links

Cannabis regulatory agencies